The  is an electric multiple unit (EMU) train type operated by Tokyo subway operator Tokyo Metro on the Tokyo Metro Tozai Line in Tokyo, Japan, since May 2010.

Design
Based on the earlier Tokyo Metro 05 series (13th batch) and Tokyo Metro 10000 series trains, the 15000 series trains have  wider doors ( as opposed to ) to speed up boarding and alighting at stations during rush-hour periods.

Operations
The 15000 series trains replaced the first batch of the 05 series trains, which have been in service since 1988.

Formation
, the fleet consists of 13 ten-car sets, numbered 51 to 63, and formed as shown below, with car 1 at the Nishi-Funabashi (west) end.

Cars 2 and 8 each have two single-arm pantographs. Car 5 has one single-arm pantograph.

Interior
Passenger accommodation consists of longitudinal bench seating throughout, with six-person seats between the doors, and two-person seats at the car ends. Passenger information is provided by pairs of 17-inch LCD information screens above each doorway.

History

The first set was delivered from Hitachi's Kudamatsu factory in February 2010.

The first 15000 series sets entered revenue service on 7 May 2010.

Thirteen sets (15101 to 15113) were delivered by 2011, with a further three sets scheduled to be delivered during fiscal 2016.

References

External links

 Tokyo Metro 15000 series information 

Electric multiple units of Japan
15000 series
Train-related introductions in 2010
Hitachi multiple units
1500 V DC multiple units of Japan